HD 175219, also known as HR 7122, is a solitary, orange hued star located in the southern constellation Corona Australis. It has an apparent magnitude of 5.35, allowing it to be faintly visible to the naked eye. At its current distance, HD 175219's brightness is diminished by 0.26 magnitudes due to interstellar dust. It has an absolute magnitude of +0.57.

This is a red giant with a stellar classification of K0 III. An earlier source gives it a class of G6 III-IV, indicating that it is an evolved G-type star with a luminosity class intermediate between a giant star and a subgiant. At present it has nearly twice the mass of the Sun but it has expanded to 12.3 times the Sun's radius. The star is metal deficient, having less than half the abundance of heavy elements compared to the Sun. Common for giant stars, it spins slowly, having a projected rotational velocity too low to be measured accurately.

References

K-type giants
Corona Australis
Coronae Australis, 30
CD-42 13761
175219
092953
229383